Karduniaš, also transcribed Kurduniash, Karduniash, Karaduniše) is a Kassite term used for the kingdom centered on Babylonia and founded by the Kassite dynasty. It is used in the 1350-1335 BC Amarna letters correspondence, and is also used frequently in Middle-Assyrian and Neo-Assyrian texts to refer to the kingdom of Babylon. The name Karaduniyaš is mainly used in the letters written between Kadashman-Enlil I, or Burna-Buriash, the Kings of Babylon, and the Pharaoh of Ancient Egypt-(called: Mizri), letters EA 1-EA 11, a subcorpus of letters, (EA for 'el Amarna').

There are two additional letters in the 382–letter Amarna corpus that reference Karaduniyaš. The first is a damaged, and partial letter, EA 200, (with no author), regarding "Ahlameans", (similar to the Suteans); the title is: "About Ahlameans". The second letter is complete and undamaged, a letter from one of the sons of Labaya, namely Mutbaal - (Mut-Bahli, or Mut-Ba'lu), letter EA 255.

Two example letters of Karaduniyaš

EA 255, Mutbaal letter no. 1 of 2, title: "No destination too far"
Letter 255 by Mutbaal, about caravans, seems to imply that his location in western Jordan, (as "Mayor of Pihilu"-(modern Pella, Jordan)), was an important trade route to the east to Babylonia, or north to Mittani.
Say [t]o the king, [my] lord and my Sun: Thus Mut-Bahl[u], your servant, the dirt at your feet, the mire you tread on. I fall at the feet of the king, my lord, 7 times and 7 times. The king, my lord, sent Haaya to me to say, "A caravan to Hanagalbat-(Mitanni), is this (man) to send on, and (all of you) send it on!" Who am I that I would not send on a caravan of the king, my lord, seeing that [La]b 'ayu, my father, [used to ser]ve the king, his lord, [and] he [himself] used to send on [all the carav]ans [that] the king [would se]nd to Hanagalbat. Let the king, my lord, send a caravan even to Karaduniyaš. I will personally conduct it under very heavy guard.  -EA 255, lines 1-25 (complete)

EA 9, Burna-Buriash letter no. 4 of 6, title: "Ancient loyalties, new request"
(Para I, 1-6) Say- (qabu (qí-bil-ma)) to Nibhurrereya, the king of Egy[pt-(Mizri), my brother ]: "(message)-Thus"-(um-ma), Thus, the king of Karad[un]iyaš, your brother. For me all goes well. For you, your household, your wives, your sons, your country, your ma[g]nates, your horses, your chariots, may all go very well.
(Para II, 7-18) From the time my ancestors and your ancestors made a mutual declaration of friendship, they sen[t] beautiful greeting-gifts to each other, and refused no request for anything beautiful. My brother has now sent me 2–minas of gold as my greeting-gift. Now, (i)f gold is plentiful, overflowing, send me as much as your ancestors (sent), but if it is scarce, send me half of what your ancestors (sent). Why have you sent me 2–minas of gold? At the moment my work on a temple is extensive, and I am quite busy with carrying it out. Send me much gold. And you for your part, whatever you want from my country, write me so that it may be taken to you.
(Para III, 19-38) In the time of Kurigalzu, my ancestor, all the Canaanites wrote here to him, saying, "C[om]e to the border of the country so we can revolt and be allied [wi]th you!" My ancestor sent them this (reply), saying, "Forget about being allied with me. If you become enemies of the king of Egypt, and are allied with anyone else—will I not then come and plunder you? How can there be an alliance with me?" – For the sake of your ancestor, my ancestor did not listen to them. Now, as for my Assyrian vassals-(i.e. Ashur-uballit I, king), I was not the one who sent them to you. Why on their own authority have they come to your country? If you love me, they will conduct no business whatsoever. Send them off to me empty–handed. I send to you as your greeting-gift 3–minas of genuine lapis lazuli, and 5–teams of horses for 5–wooden chariots.  -EA 9, lines 1-38 (3 paragraphs) (complete)

See also
Burna-Buriash II
Kadashman-Enlil I
Ashur-uballit I, (ascendant)-King of Assyria
Greeting-gift (Šulmānī)
Amarna letters

References

Moran, William L. The Amarna Letters. Johns Hopkins University Press, 1987, 1992. (softcover)

External links
 Picture of EA 9, obverse, British Museum, and discussion.
 Article about Amarna letters, EA 9 (labelled 162)
 

States and territories established in the 14th century BC
States and territories disestablished in the 14th century BC
Amarna letters locations
Babylonia
Exonyms